Wenquan Subdistrict is a subdistrict situated in northern Anning City, Yunnan province, southwestern China. It lies about 8 km north of Anning City, situated on the bank of the Tanglang River. Formerly a town, its status changed to a subdistrict of Anning in 2011. The town is named for its hot spring.

References

Anning, Yunnan
Township-level divisions of Kunming